Matriptases are an enzyme family. This enzyme cleaves various synthetic substrates with Arg or Lys at the P1 position and prefers small side-chain amino acids, such as Ala and Gly, at the P2 position

This trypsin-like integral-membrane serine peptidase has been implicated in breast cancer invasion and metastasis. It belongs to proteases of PA superfamily.

Human matriptases
ST14, also known as matriptase
TMPRSS6, also known as matriptase 2

References

External links 
 

EC 3.4.21